is an asteroid and slow rotator, classified as near-Earth object and potentially hazardous asteroid of the Apollo group, approximately 1.4 kilometers in diameter.

It came within 6.5 million km (4 million miles, 17 lunar distances) of Earth on 5 November 2012.

It was discovered on 9 August 2007, by the Lincoln Near-Earth Asteroid Research team (LINEAR) at the U.S. Lincoln Laboratory Experimental Test Site in Socorro, New Mexico.

It was studied by the 70-meter (230 ft) Goldstone Deep Space Network antenna as it came near Earth, which resulted in radar images and other data about the asteroid, such as its very long rotation period of approximately 100 hours.

 may be a dormant comet related to the November γ Pegasids meteor shower.

Numbering and naming 

This minor planet was numbered by the Minor Planet Center on 9 May 2009. As of 2018, it has not been named.

See also 
 List of asteroid close approaches to Earth

References

External links 
 NASA Radar Images Asteroid 2007 PA8 (5 November 2012)
 Nine Radar Images of Asteroid 2007 PA8 (26 November 2012)
 Asteroid Lightcurve Database (LCDB), query form (info )
 Asteroids and comets rotation curves, CdR – Observatoire de Genève, Raoul Behrend
 
 
 

214869
214869
214869
214869
214869
214869
20121105
20070809